Eneko may refer to:
 Eneko (given name), a Basque masculine given name 
 Eneko (Eberron), a fictional creature in the World of Eberron 
 The Japanese name for Skitty, a fictional creature in the Pokémon franchise